Lowe Mill is a former cotton mill of approximately  located southwest of downtown Huntsville, Alabama.

Today, the building is operated by Lowe Mill ARTS & Entertainment, houses the largest privately owned arts facility in the United States. Owned by Jimmy Hudson and previously started by Jim Hudson, Lowe Mill is currently home to two hundred artists. Each artist with their own style whether thats paper flowers, watercolor, soap, candles, kombucha, coffee, and teaching people how to do what they do.

History
In 1900, Arthur H. Lowe of Fitchburg, Massachusetts, formed Lowe Manufacturing Company, and began the building of Huntsville's fifth textile mill. Lowe Mill opened in 1901 with 25,000 spindles that helped to turn locally-grown cotton into woven cloth.  In 1902, Eastern Manufacturing Company built the final large mill in Huntsville, a weaving mill across from Lowe Mill. Lowe Mill and Eastern Manufacturing merged their companies and the two buildings in 1904. The spinning mill supplied yarns for the weaving mills, where the highest grade ginghams and shirtings were made to supply large clothing manufacturers throughout the nation.

In December 1932, Lowe Manufacturing declared bankruptcy, and the factory started back up again under Lowe Mills, Inc. in January 1933, with Donald Comer, head of Birmingham's Avondale Mills, as majority stockholder. In 1936, Lowe Mill changed hands again when Edwin Greene of New York became the majority stockholder of the renamed Lowe Corporation. In March 1937, Lowe Corporation was dissolved and the plant was sold to Walter Laxson and became a cotton warehouse.

At the end of World War II, in December 1945, Nashville-based General Shoe Co. opened a shoe factory in Lowe Mill, employing up to 800 people. In 1959, General Shoe Co. became Genesco, Inc.  Many US soldiers in Vietnam wore boots made at Genesco's Huntsville factory.  In 1978, Genesco sold it and Martin Industries turned Lowe Mill into a warehouse for residential and commercial heating systems.  In 1999, realtor Gene McLain bought Lowe Mill and then in 2001, sold it to Research Genetics founder, Jim Hudson, who is the current owner of Lowe Mill.

The mill currently houses Lowe Mill ARTS & Entertainment, which provides art studio and exhibition space for over 200 artists.  The mill and surrounding neighborhood were added to the National Register of Historic Places in 2011.

Timeline 

1900 Arthur H. Lowe, president of the New England Manufactures’ Association, arrived in Huntsville. Lowe planned arrangements for the incorporation of Lowe Manufacturing Company and the construction of Huntsville's fifth mill, but left abruptly. It was Pratt, in 1900, who incorporated Lowe Manufacturing Company. Soon after Pratt and O’Shaughnessy agreed to terms for the construction of Lowe Mill, the fifth cotton mill in Huntsville.

1901 Lowe Mill opened for textile production. D.C. Finney is put in charge of the plant acting as agent for Arthur H. Lowe. The company provided housing for mill workers, whose job was to spin local cotton into fibers and yarn for the textile industry. The following year, Eastern Manufacturing Company completed a weaving mill on the adjacent property. This new enterprise utilized the output from Lowe Mill to produce high-grade clothes and linens.

1903 Planned for an adjunct to house the machinery adding 11,000 spindles, the organizers expected a total of 26,000 spindles. A year later the companies merged and the two buildings were joined.

1907 Lowe Mill and the Eastern Manufacturing Co. consolidated into Lowe Manufacturing, Inc.

1911 Hunter Manufacturing Co. took over Eastern Manufacturing Co, but the mill continued to operate as a textile mill under the title "Lowe Mill". The mill complex went through several physical and ownership changes.

1920-30 Across the nation workers in all industries began to unionize, the workers in Huntsville's cotton mills were no exception. Labor strikes occasionally disrupted work in Huntsville's cotton mills throughout this decade.

1932 Lowe Manufacturing Company went bankrupt at the height of the Great Depression.

1933 The mill reincorporated as Lowe Mills, Inc. in January 1933, with Donald Comer, head of Birmingham, Alabama's Avondale Mills, as majority stockholder.

1933 Roosevelt's "New Deal" National Industrial Recovery Act (NIRA) protected the rights of workers, membership spiked from 40,000 to 270,000.

1934 On July 17, 1934, the workers of Lowe Mill walked off their shift due to lack of progress to improve working conditions.

1936-37 Textile manufacturing ended despite an attempt to rescue the mill from failure with an ownership change in 1936, with Edwin Greene of New York becoming majority stockholder. When operations ended in March 1937, the Lowe Corp. buildings were sold to Walter Laxton and used as a warehouse for cotton.

1946 General Shoe Company (founded as the Jarmen Shoe Company of Nashville, TN in 1924, changed to General Shoe in the 1930s and became Genesco in 1959) began to manufacture shoes.

1959 General Shoe changed its name to Genesco. In the '60s, during the Vietnam war, Genesco produced the majority combat boots for US soldiers. Genesco continued production until 1979, and many US soldiers in Vietnam wore boots made at Genesco's Huntsville factory.

1978 Genesco closed and Martin Industries turned Lowe Mill into a warehouse for residential and commercial heating systems. In 1999, realtor Gene McLain bought Lowe Mill and then in 2001, sold it to Research Genetics founder, Jim Hudson. Hudson remains the current owner of Lowe Mill.

2001 Jim Hudson, the founder of HudsonAlpha Research Genetics, purchased Lowe Mill at the corner of Seminole Drive and 9th Avenue and gave new life to what was Huntsville's first suburb.

2004 The Flying Monkey Arts Center opened on the 2nd floor in the South building.

2008 The studios on the second-floor connector (the building joining the South facility to the North) opens for business.

2009 The 3rd floor is opened by Lowe Mill ARTS & Entertainment, LLC.

2010 The 1st floor South building studios are opened to the public.

2012-13 In February Railroad Room 3 is finished for Vertical House Records and Dustin Timbrook Studio; Railroad Room 7 opens for Tangled String Studio in April 2012; Pizzelle's Confections opensRailroad Room 4 in Feb 2013 and Julie Gill in Railroad Room 9.

2014 The 2nd floor North building studios are open to the public. The most recent addition to Lowe Mill A&E was the opening of the second floor of the North Building. This addition made Lowe Mill A&E the nation's largest privately owned arts and entertainment facility, totaling 129 public studios and over 200 working artists.

References

Further reading

External links

Lowe Mill ARTS & Entertainment
Historic American Engineering Record (HAER) documentation, filed under Huntsville, Madison County, AL:

Industrial buildings completed in 1901
Textile mills in Huntsville, Alabama
Historic American Engineering Record in Alabama
National Register of Historic Places in Huntsville, Alabama
Industrial buildings and structures on the National Register of Historic Places in Alabama
Historic districts in Huntsville, Alabama
Cotton mills in the United States